Dover Spencer Peneha Samuels (born 9 July 1939) is a former Labour Member of Parliament in New Zealand from 1996 to 2008 inclusive.

Biography

Political career

Samuels joined the Labour Party and became its Māori Senior Vice President. In 1994 he challenged Maryan Street for the Labour Party presidency, but lost by a wide margin, 303 votes to Street and 75 for Samuels.

He was awarded the New Zealand 1990 Commemoration Medal for services to New Zealand.

He first entered Parliament as a list MP in the 1996 election, and was the MP for Te Tai Tokerau since the 1999 election. When the Labour Party formed a government following its victory in 1999, Samuels became the Minister of Māori Affairs, but resigned this role in June 2000 pending an investigation into alleged sex crimes committed before he entered politics. The police later cleared Samuels of all charges, and Samuels alleged that the accusations had political motivations. He was reinstated as a Minister of State in 2002, but in 2005 was involved in further controversy following a late-night incident in which he publicly urinated in a hallway within Auckland's Heritage hotel.

Samuels lost his Māori electorate of Te Tai Tokerau in 2005 to the Māori Party candidate Hone Harawira. However, he was returned to parliament due to his high position on the Labour Party list. He was made the Associate Minister for Economic Development, Housing, Tourism and Industry and Regional Development.

On 31 October 2007, during the Cabinet reshuffle, Samuels lost his position as a Minister outside Cabinet and was replaced by Darren Hughes. He returned to the backbench.

Samuels did not contest the 2008 election.

Personal life
He is an active member of the Rātana Church of New Zealand.

References

1939 births
Living people
New Zealand Rātanas
New Zealand Labour Party MPs
Members of the Cabinet of New Zealand
New Zealand list MPs
New Zealand MPs for Māori electorates
Members of the New Zealand House of Representatives
21st-century New Zealand politicians